Hydroxymethylation is a chemical reaction that installs the CH2OH group.  The transformation can be implemented in many ways and applies to both industrial and biochemical processes.

Hydroxymethylation with formaldehyde
A common method for hydroxymethylation involves the reaction of formaldehyde with active C-H and N-H bonds:
R3C-H  +  CH2O  →  R3C-CH2OH
R2N-H  +  CH2O  →  R2N-CH2OH
A typical active C-H bond is provided by a terminal acetylene or the alpha protons of an aldehyde. In industry, hydroxymethylation of acetaldehyde with formaldehyde is used in the production of pentaerythritol:

P-H bonds are also prone to reaction with formaldehyde.  Tetrakis(hydroxymethyl)phosphonium chloride ([P(CH2OH)4]Cl) is produced in this way from phosphine (PH3).

Hydroxymethylation in demethylation
5-Methylcytosine is a common epigenetic marker.  The methyl group is modified by oxidation of the methyl group in a process called hydroxymethylation:
RCH3  +  O  →  RCH2OH
This oxidation is thought to be a prelude to removal, regenerating cytosine.

Representative reactions
A two-step hydroxymethylation of aldehydes involves methylenation followed by hydroboration-oxidation:
RCHO  +  Ph3P=CH2 →  RCH=CH2  +  Ph3PO  
RCH=CH2   +  R2BH  →  RCH2-CH2BR2 
RCH2-CH2BR2  +  H2O2  →  RCH2-CH2OH  +  "HOBR2" 

Silylmethyl Grignard reagents are nucleophilic  reagents for hydroxymethylation of ketones:
R2C=O  +  ClMgCH2SiR'3 →  R2C(OMgCl)CH2SiR'3  
R2C(OMgCl)CH2SiR'3  +  H2O  +  H2O2  → R2C(OH)CH2OH  +  "HOSiR'3"

Reactions of hydroxymethylated compounds
A common reaction of hydroxymethylated compounds is further reaction with a second equivalent of an active X-H bond:
hydroxymethylation: X-H  +  CH2O  →  X-CH2OH
crosslinking: X-H  +  X-CH2OH  →  X-CH2-X  +  H2O

This pattern is illustrated by the use of formaldehyde in the production various polymers and resins from phenol-formaldehyde condensations (Bakelite, Novolak, and calixarenes). Similar crosslinking occurs in urea-formaldehyde resins.

The hydroxymethylation of N-H and P-H bonds can often be reversed by base.  This reaction is illustrated by the preparation of tris(hydroxymethyl)phosphine:
[P(CH2OH)4]Cl + NaOH → P(CH2OH)3 + H2O + H2C=O + NaCl

When conducted in the presence of chlorinating agents, hydroxymethylation leads to chloromethylation as illustrated by thee Blanc chloromethylation.

Related
Hydroxyethylation involves the installation of the CH2CH2OH group, as practiced in ethoxylation.
Aminomethylation is often effected with Eschenmoser's salt, [(CH3)2NCH2]OTf

References

Carbon-carbon bond forming reactions